Ana Romero Reguera de Carrasco (1931/1932 – 15 July 2020) was a Spanish rancher and businesswoman. In 1958, she and her husband, Fernando Carrasco, established a cattle ranch, known as "La Cobatilla" in Alcalá de los Gazules. Later, her son, Lucas Carrasco, helped run the ranch. Reguera was listed as "head of livestock" for the ranch and focused on developing a herd of cattle with the "Santa Colomeña" bloodline, which had a particular lineage not raised in the province. Despite this, the ranch kept with small herds to retain the purity of the breed and did not send their cattle to shows or events.

Romero Reguera de Carrasco died on 15 July 2020, aged 88.

References

Ranchers
Spanish women
Bullfighting in Spain
1930s births
2020 deaths
Date of birth missing
People from Jerez de la Frontera